Yu Byeong-heon (born 17 April 1964) is a South Korean former cyclist. He competed in the team time trial at the 1988 Summer Olympics.

References

External links
 

1964 births
Living people
South Korean male cyclists
Olympic cyclists of South Korea
Cyclists at the 1988 Summer Olympics
Place of birth missing (living people)